Texas is an unincorporated community in Stone County, Mississippi, United States.  The community was named after the U.S. state of Texas.

The Red Creek flows north of Texas.

Fairley Cemetery is located in Texas.

References 

Unincorporated communities in Mississippi
Unincorporated communities in Stone County, Mississippi
Mississippi placenames of Native American origin